Impatiens meruensis is a species of flowering plant in the family Balsaminaceae. It is found in Kenya, Sudan, Tanzania, and Uganda. Its natural habitats include mountain forests, streambanks, and swamps. It may grow in the spray zones of waterfalls. It is generally a widespread species in its range, at least in the uplands of Kenya. Including the forests of Cherangani hills.

References

meruensis
Least concern plants
Flora of Kenya
Flora of Sudan
Flora of Tanzania
Flora of Uganda
Taxonomy articles created by Polbot